Metsaääre is a village in Märjamaa Parish, Rapla County in western Estonia.

References

 

Villages in Rapla County